RFA Fort Charlotte (A236) was a stores issuing ship of the Royal Fleet Auxiliary.

Launched on 12 February 1944 as SS Buffalo Park a merchant steamship constructed for Canada’s Merchant Navy in 1944 during the Second World War as part of Canada's Park ship program.  
The ship was acquired by the Ministry of War Transport in 1945 and renamed Fort Charlotte, a Fort ship. The ship was transferred to the RFA on 11 June 1948. Decommissioned in 1967, she was sold to Singapore breakers in January 1968.
 During World War II, 28 were lost to enemy action, and four were lost due to accidents. Many of the surviving 166 ships passed to the United States Maritime Commission.

See also
RFA Fort Langley (A230)
RFA Fort Duquesne (A229)
RFA Fort Rosalie (A186)
Fort Cataraqui (ship)

References

Ships of the Royal Fleet Auxiliary
1944 ships